The National Vanguard is a name that has been used for at least two neo-fascist and neo-Nazi groups in Italy.

Original group
The original National Vanguard was an extra-parliamentary movement formed as a breakaway group from the Italian Social Movement (MSI) by Stefano Delle Chiaie in 1960, initially based around a group of youths recruited by the government to break up leftist meetings. The Vanguard rejected the parliamentary route of the Social Movement, preferring instead to work outside the political system to subvert democracy and bring about a return to fascism. A leaflet produced by the group described them as in favour of "man-to-man engagements" in which their members were to be encouraged to be as ruthless as possible.

Members of the movement were frequently denounced as terrorists and it was claimed that Della Chiaie had links to bomb making concerns in Spain. The group also had close links with Ordine Nuovo and other extremist groups. Vincenzo Vinciguerra was a notorious member of the group. The group was adjudged responsible for a series of bomb attacks in Italy in 1969, the most notorious of which was the Piazza Fontana bombing. The group also took a leading role in the abortive coup attempt by Junio Valerio Borghese the following year.

Avanguardia Nazionale organized the assassination of Italian magistrate Vittorio Occorsio, employing arms supplied by the CIA via its contacts in Francoist Spain. For the killing Pierluigi Concutelli is currently serving a life sentence in Italy. Avanguardia Nazionale member Mario Ricci participated to the 1978 assassination of Argala, the etarra who had taken part, five years before, in the assassination of Francisco Franco's prime minister, Luis Carrero Blanco.

Second group
A second group bearing this name was set up in 1970 by Adriano Tilgher, but this movement was outlawed by the Italian government, who saw it as an attempt to refound the National Fascist Party.

Magazine
A neo-fascist magazine entitled Avanguardia continues to be published monthly. It may claim to be the official organ of the National Vanguard, although the movement remains illegal in Italy—the official movement to which Avanguardia is connected is the Comunità Politica di Avanguardia (Political Vanguard Community).

References

External links
Avanguardia Nazionale

Anti-communism in Italy
Anti-communist organizations
Defunct organisations designated as terrorist in Italy
Factions of the Years of Lead (Italy)
Neo-Nazism in Italy
Neo-fascist organisations in Italy
Neo-fascist terrorism